Michael J. Urbonas (September 26, 1886 - November 18, 1976) of the Roman Catholic Diocese of Erie, Pennsylvania, is author of the poem The Three Kings and the book One Hundred Religious Rhymes.  The Three Kings is a popular Christmas celebratory retelling of the Biblical Magi, who, in Christian tradition, visited Jesus shortly after his birth.

Urbonas died on November 18, 1976.

References

External links 
 The Three Kings poem by Msgr. Michael J. Urbonas
 A physical description of the book One Hundred Religious Rhymes (1961) by an antique book dealer.

1976 deaths
American clergy
Writers from Erie, Pennsylvania
1886 births